Prathap Joseph is an Indian journalist, cinematographer and filmmaker.

Career 
He belongs to new-age indie filmmakers from Kerala. Active in filmmaking since 2010, he has conducted workshops in cinematography and filmmaking at the K. R. Narayanan National Institute of Visual Science and Arts, the National Institute of Technology Calicut and at Thunchath Ezhuthachan Malayalam University. He is also the founder of the Light Source Photographic Society and the Minimal Cinema film commune, and a director of the New Wave Film School.

Oru Rathri Oru Pakal (A day, a night), a Malayalam film written, cinematographed, and directed by Prathap Joseph, had its Indian premiere in Dec 2019 at the 3rd edition of the Kazhcha-Niv Independent Film Festival (KNIFF). Oru Rathri Oru Pakal was nominated for Pune International Film Festival. In January 2020, the film took a 'non-theatrical distribution' route, releasing at the Open Screen.

Filmography
As cinematographer

As film director

Awards 
Best Cinematographer – Tarkovsky International Film Festival, Russia [Zerkalo]

References

External links 
 
 Prathap Joseph at New Wave Film School
 Prathap Joseph on Media One TV

Indian filmmakers
Indian cinematographers
Year of birth missing (living people)
Living people